The Duhallow Junior A Football Championship is the top footballing competition in the Duhallow division in Cork. It was first run after the formation of the Duhallow division in 1933. The Championship includes a group stage, therefore every team has at least 2 matches. The winners and runner up of this competition go on to compete in the Cork Junior A Football Championship.

Cullen are the title-holders after defeating Kanturk by 4-16 to 1-02 in the 2022 championship final played in Boherbue.

Format

Group stage 
The 6 teams are divided into two groups of three. Over the course of the group stage, each team plays once against the others in the group, resulting in each team being guaranteed at least two games. Two points are awarded for a win, one for a draw and zero for a loss. The teams are ranked in the group stage table by points gained, then scoring difference and then their head-to-head record. The top two teams in each group qualify for the knockout stage.

Knockout stage 
Semi-finals: The two group winners and the two runners-up from the group stage contest this round. The two winners from these games advance to the final.

Final: The two semi-final winners contest the final. The winning team are declared champions.

Promotion and relegation 
At the end of the championship, the winning team enters the Cork Junior A Football Championship and by winning this, they will be promoted to the Cork Premier Junior Football Championship for the following season. There is no relegation to the Duhallow Junior B Football Championship.

Teams 

As of 2023, the teams include:

Roll of honour

List of finals

Records and statistics

Gaps
Top ten longest gaps between successive championship titles:

 47 years: Kanturk (1962-2009)
 42 years: Boherbue (1935-1977)
 37 years: Cullen (1967-2004)
 30 years: Millstreet (1963-1993)
 30 years: Kiskeam (1964-1994)
 29 years: Boherbue (1988-2017)
 28 years: Cullen (1939-1967)
 24 years: Knocknagree (1991-2015)
 23 years: Newmarket (1970-1993)
 21 years: Dromtarriffe (1974-1995)
 21 years: Ballydesmond (1986-2007)

Consecutive wins 
Quintuple

 Boherbue (2017, 2018, 2019, 2020, 2021)

Quadruple

Knocknagree (1981, 1982, 1983, 1984)

 Treble 

Newmarket (1968, 1969, 1970)
Knocknagree (1989, 1990, 1991)

 Double 

Dromtarriffe (1933, 1934)
Dromtarriffe (1945, 1946)
Castlemagner (1947, 1948)
Newmarket (1949, 1950)
Castlemagner (1960, 1961)
Dromtarriffe (1973, 1974)
Rockchapel (1976, 1977)
Knocknagree (1978, 1979)
Kiskeam (1996, 1997)
Kiskeam (1999, 2000)
Knocknagree (2015, 2016)

Debut final for clubs

County record
A list of every Duhallow appearance in the Cork Junior A Hurling Championship final includes:

Roll of honour

Junior B Football Championship

2023 teams

Junior B1 Football Championship

Junior B2 Football Championship

See also
 Duhallow Junior A Hurling Championship

References

Gaelic football competitions in County Cork
1933 establishments in Ireland